Happy McNair Hall (born October 15, 1987) is a Bahamian international footballer who plays for local side Lyford Cay as a defender.

Career

College and amateur
Born in Nassau, Hall played college soccer at Appalachian State University, and had three stints with the Bradenton Academics in the USL Premier Development League in 2005, 2007 and 2009.

Professional
Upon graduating, Hall had a trial with Romanian outfit Ceahlăul Piatra Neamț in February 2008 and briefly played with North York Astros in the Canadian Soccer League in 2008, before joining English side Gosport Borough in February 2009, on a deal until the end of the 2008–09 season.

Following the conclusion of the English football season, Hall returned to North America, and signed to play a third stint for Bradenton Academics in 2009, alongside his national teammate Cameron Hepple. Towards the end of the 2009 PDL season Hall went on trials and secured a deal with Ma Pau SC in the TT Pro League in Trinidad and Tobago.

On March 7, 2011 Hall signed a two-year contract with Dayton Dutch Lions of the American USL Pro league.

International
Hall made his debut for the Bahamas in a September 2006 Caribbean Cup qualification match against the Cayman Islands. He had earned 10 caps by November 2008, four of them in World Cup qualification games. Hall captained the side in the 2010 World Cup qualification matches.

International goals
Scores and results list the Bahamas' goal tally first.

Personal life
Hall is founder of the YESI Soccer and Skillz Soccer Schools in the Bahamas.

References

External links
 Dayton Dutch Lions profile
 
 

1987 births
Living people
Sportspeople from Nassau, Bahamas
Association football defenders
Bahamian footballers
Bahamas international footballers
Bahamas under-20 international footballers
Appalachian State Mountaineers men's soccer players
IMG Academy Bradenton players
North York Astros players
Gosport Borough F.C. players
Ma Pau Stars S.C. players
Dayton Dutch Lions players
Renegades FC players
Canadian Soccer League (1998–present) players
Southern Football League players
USL League Two players
USL Championship players
TT Pro League players
BFA Senior League players
Bahamian expatriate footballers
Expatriate soccer players in the United States
Expatriate soccer players in Canada
Expatriate footballers in England
Expatriate footballers in Trinidad and Tobago
Bahamian expatriate sportspeople in the United States
Bahamian expatriate sportspeople in Canada
Bahamian expatriate sportspeople in England
Bahamian expatriate sportspeople in Trinidad and Tobago